Actinopus harti is a species of mygalomorph spiders in the family Actinopodidae. It is found in Trinidad.

References

harti
Spiders described in 1895